The Canadian Academy of Recording Arts and Sciences (CARAS) is a non-profit organization responsible for promoting Canadian music and artists. It administers the Juno Awards, the Canadian Music Hall of Fame and the MusiCounts music education charity. CARAS's mandate is to promote and celebrate Canadian music and artists.

Since 2015, Mark Cohon has served as its chairman.

Juno Awards

The Juno Awards is Canada's premiere music awards show, which encompass a week-long celebration of Canadian music, culminating in The Juno Awards Broadcast where Canadian artists are recognized for excellence of achievement in recorded music.

MusiCounts
MusiCounts, Canada's music education charity associated with CARAS, is dedicated to ensuring that young Canadians regardless of socio-economic circumstances and cultural background have the opportunity to experience the joy of music, explore their talent, build self-esteem, and above all dream big.

Since its establishment in 1997, MusiCounts will have:
 Awarded nearly 5 million dollars to help keep music alive.
 Impacted 262 Post-Secondary graduates and an estimated 400,000 students, their schools and communities.  
 In 2011–2012, MusiCounts honoured its 7th extraordinary music teacher through the MusiCounts Teacher of the Year Award.

Canadian Music Hall of Fame

CARAS has been inducting into the Canadian Music Hall of Fame (CMHF) since 1978 and has inducted 57 artists and industry professionals since that time.

See also

 Juno Award
 Music of Canada
 National Academy of Recording Arts & Sciences

References

Further reading
 Showcase: a Directory of Canadian Recording Artists. Toronto, Ont.: CARAS. N.B.: Inaugural ed. published in June 1980. Without ISBN or ISSN

External links
 

Music organizations based in Canada